Saadallah, also spelled Saadullah, Sa'dullah or Sadollah is a male given name meaning Joy of God. People with the name include:

People with the given name
Sadullah Ergin (born 1964), Turkish politician
Sadullah Güney (1883–1945), Ottoman Army officer
Saadallah Howayek (1853–1915), Lebanese politician
Saadallah al-Jabiri (1891–1948), Syrian prime minister
Sadullah Khan, South African writer and speaker on Islamic issues
Saadallah Mazraani, Lebanese communist politician
Saadallah Agha al-Qalaa (born 1950), Syrian government minister
Saadallah Wannous (1941–1997), Syrian playwright

People with the surname
Amir Sadollah (born 1980), American mixed martial artist
Abdulla Saadalla, Tanzanian CCM politician and Member of Parliament

See also
Saad (disambiguation)
Saad, a given name and family name
Sa'd al-Din (disambiguation)

Arabic masculine given names
Turkish masculine given names